Amit Chachan (born 5 July 1984) is an Indian politician and member of 15th Rajasthan Assembly from Nohar constituency. He is a member of Indian National Congress. In 2018 Rajasthan Legislative Assembly election, he received 93851 votes, out of total 202003 votes polled.

References 

Indian politicians
Living people
1984 births
Rajasthan MLAs 2018–2023
Rajasthani politicians